Like the Linen is the solo debut album by alternative folk artist Thao Nguyen, released in 2005 under Trust Me Records.

Track listing

External links
 Official website

Thao Nguyen albums
2005 albums